Senino is a rural locality (a village) in Novoselskoye Rural Settlement, Kovrovsky District, Vladimir Oblast, Russia. The population was 21 as of 2010.

Geography 
Senino is located 28 km southwest of Kovrov (the district's administrative centre) by road. Dobrograd is the nearest rural locality.

References 

Rural localities in Kovrovsky District